The  was a rebellion against the Yamato court that took place in Tsukushi Province, Japan (now nearby Ogōri city in Fukuoka Prefecture) in 527 AD. The rebellion was named after its leader, Iwai, who is believed by historians to have been a powerful governor of Tsukushi. The rebellion was quelled by the Yamato court, and played an important part in the consolidation of early Japan. The main record of the rebellion can be found in the Nihon Shoki, although it is also mentioned in Kojiki and other historical sources.

Background 
The Yamato Kingdom was formed in the central areas of Honshu in the late 3rd or early 4th century, and by 350 this state had extended its rule to the western part of Honshu and the northern part of Kyushu. In 366, Yamato invaded the Korean peninsula, which at the time was divided into three kingdoms: Goguryeo, Paekje, and Silla. In this campaign the kingdom of Yamato subdued the kingdom of Pаekje, and forced it to pay an annual tribute. The Japanese also managed to establish a military colony on the southern coast (near present-day Busan) in the Mimana (Gaya in Japanese) area. On several occasions (391 and 404), Japanese troops as allies of the Paekje kingdom invaded Korea and fought against the Silla and Goguryeo kingdoms.

Rebellion 
At the beginning of the 6th century, the rising Silla kingdom began to threaten Japanese possessions in Korea. In 512, four districts of the Japanese colony of Mimana surrendered to the Koreans, and the remaining Japanese possessions came under siege. At the same time, the kingdom of Paekje, a Japanese vassal, was attacked from two sides by the kingdoms of Silla and Goguryeo, and sent 513 Confucian scholars to Yamato with a request for help - they brought with them the first books, and thus literacy came to Japan. Before Yamato could send aid to Mimana and Paekje, Iwai, the governor of the Tsukushi region (semi-autonomous Kumaso region in northern Kyushu), made a treacherous alliance with the Silla kingdom, thus blocking the Yamato kingdom's attempts to send aid to Korea. This was the first recorded rebellion against the ruling Yamato dynasty. Mononobe no Arakabi, the leader of a warrior clan, was sent to quell the rebellion. In 528, Iwai was overthrown and executed, and the previous autonomy of his area ended with the establishment of Daizafu Fortress, a government military stronghold on the island of Kyushu.

Consequences 
Power in northern Kyushu passed into the hands of the Otomo clan, but Japanese possessions in southern Korea were lost - Mimana fell to the Silla kingdom in 562.

References

The Cambridge History of Japan: Ancient Japan (Google Books)

External links
Nihon Shoki Online English Translations.Scroll 17 - Emperor Keitai

6th-century rebellions
Kofun period
Rebellions in Japan
520s conflicts
6th century in Japan
527